Möngönmorit (silver horse; also: Möngönmor't) is a sum of Töv Province in Mongolia. The settlement is located just to the west of the Kherlen River and on the north side of a wide valley. Mongonmorit (or Mungunmorit) is the largest settlement close to the headwaters of the Onon River, the major tributary of the Amur River.  This region and its people are well described in Chapter 1 of Black Dragon River: A Journey Down the Amur River Between Russia and China.

References 

Districts of Töv Province